The UCI Road World Championships Elite Men's Road Race is a one-day event for professional cyclists that takes place annually. The winner is considered the World Cycling Champion (or World Road Cycling Champion) and earns the right to wear the Rainbow Jersey for a full year in road race or stage events. The event is a single 'mass start' road race with the winner being the first across the line at the completion of the full race distance. The road race is contested by riders organized by national cycling teams as opposed to commercially sponsored or trade teams, which is the standard in professional cycling.

History 
The first professional World Cycling Championship took place in 1927 at the Nürburgring in Germany and was won by Alfredo Binda, of Italy. In recent years, the race is held towards the end of the European season, usually following the Vuelta a España.

The elite men's race is usually won by riders on the UCI World Tour or its predecessors. However, in the past there were separate events for amateur riders, mainly from Eastern bloc countries.

For men at the elite professional level, the World Cycling Championship, along with the Tour de France, and the Giro d'Italia, forms the Triple Crown of Cycling.

Course 
The event can be held over either a relatively flat course which favors cycling sprinters or over a hilly course which favors more of a climbing specialist or all-round type of cyclist.

Medalists 

Seven cyclists have successfully defended their title (three Belgians, two Italians, a Slovakian and a French): Georges Ronsse (Belgium, 1928–29); Rik Van Steenbergen (Belgium, 1956–57); Rik Van Looy (Belgium, 1960–61); Gianni Bugno (Italy, 1991–92); Paolo Bettini (Italy, 2006–07), Peter Sagan (Slovakia, 2015–17) and Julian Alaphilippe (France, 2020–21). Sagan is the only rider with three straight titles (2015–17). Spaniard Alejandro Valverde has the most total medals by any individual rider with seven (1 gold in 2018; 2 silver in 2003, 2005; 4 bronze in 2006, 2012–14).

Most successful riders

Medals per country

Notes

See also
 UCI Road World Championships
 GP Wolber

References

 
Men's road race
Recurring sporting events established in 1927
Men's road bicycle races
Lists of UCI Road World Championships medalists
Super Prestige Pernod races